The 2009 Asian Table Tennis Championships were held in Lucknow, India, from 16 to 22 November 2009.

Medal summary

Medal table

Events

References

Asian Table Tennis Championships
Asian Table Tennis Championships
Table Tennis Championships
Table tennis in India
Table tennis competitions in India
Asian Table Tennis Championships